All Saints' Church, Oystermouth (officially "All Saints, Oystermouth") is an Anglican church in the diocese of Swansea and Brecon, south Wales. It is located in Mumbles and is a Grade II listed building (listed 23 April 1952 as "a large church with substantial medieval fabric and good interior detail including early medieval piscina and font and C20 glass") The church stands on a hillside, not far from Oystermouth Castle.

The building is estimated to have been built in the mid-12th century, having first been mentioned in writing in 1141. It originally consisted of a tower on its western side, a nave and a lower chancel; the former nave are now the south aisle. A porch was constructed on the northern side in the 19th century, and in 1873 an organ chamber and vestry were built, to the design of Richard Kyrke Penson. The church was substantially reconstructed in 1915, adding a new nave and chancel and a north aisle. The formerchancel became the Lady Chapel. Oak panels for the altar in the Lady Chapel were carved in 1937 by the Revd J. D. Davies.

The stained glass in the church includes a memorial window, commemorating the Mumbles lifeboat disaster of 1947; it shows lifeboatmen at work and was designed by Glantawe Studios and installed in 1977. There are memorials in the churchyard to the eight members of the Mumbles lifeboat crew who were killed in the incident.

The most notable grave in the churchyard is that of the English doctor and editor Thomas Bowdler, who died in Swansea in 1825.

A former archbishop of Canterbury, Dr Rowan Williams, attended the church as a boy, and was mentored by Eddie Hughes, vicar from 1946 to 1976.

Further reading 

 A History of All Saints’ Church Oystermouth by Geoffrey R. Orrin and Dr. F. G. Cowley, 1990

References

Grade II listed churches in Swansea
12th-century church buildings in Wales
Mumbles